HLA-DR12(DR12) is a HLA-DR serotype that recognizes the DRB1*1201 to *1203, *1206. DR12 serotype is a split antigen of the older HLA-DR5 serotype group which also contains the similar HLA-DR11 antigens.

Serology

The table above describes the efficiency of serological typing of DR12 and DR5.  Serotypes are unknown the following alleles: DRB1*1204,*1205 to *1207 to *1215

Alleles
There are only 2 common allels for DRB1*12, *1201 and *1202. *1202 is more common
on the West Pacific Rim and particularly Indochina and the South Pacific.

Disease associations
DR12 is associated with vulval lichen sclerosus, and undifferentiated spondyloarthritis.

DRB1*1201 is associated with  iritis in  juvenile arthritis, primary antiphospholipid syndrome,  tiopronin intolerance in rheumatoid arthritis, adult chronic articular Still's disease

DRB1*1202 is found to be increased in narcolepsy associated sudden death syndrome in the Thai population, and narcolepsy in the Japanese population.

Extended linkage
DRB1*12:DQA1*0505:DQBA1*0301 haplotype: DR12-DQ7.5/DR7-DQ2.2 is a transhaplotype risk for coeliac disease

DRB1*1201:DRB3*01/03: colorectal cancer

Genetic Linkage

HLA-DR12 is genetically linked to DR52 and HLA-DQ7 serotypes.

References

5